is a passenger railway station located in the city of Naruto, Tokushima, Japan. It is operated by JR Shikoku and has the station number "T05". It is the station closest to Ryōzen-ji, the first temple of the Shikoku 88 temple pilgrimage.

Lines
Only local services stop at the station.

Layout
The station consists of two side platforms serving two tracks. The station building is unstaffed and serves only as a waiting room. Access to the opposite platform is by means of a footbridge.

Platforms

History
Bandō Station opened by the privately run Awa Electric Railway (later the Awa Railway) on 15 February 1923. After the Awa Railway was nationalized on 1 July 1933, Japanese Government Railways (JGR) took over control of the station and operated it as part of the Awa Line. On 20 March 1935, the station became part of the Kōtoku Main Line. With the privatization of JNR on 1 April 1987, the station came under the control of JR Shikoku.

Passenger statistics
In fiscal 2019, the station was used by an average of 390 passengers daily

Surrounding area
Naruto City Hall Bando Liaison Office
Naruto City Bando Elementary School
Bandō prisoner-of-war camp, National Historic Site
 Ryōzen-ji

See also
 List of Railway Stations in Japan

References

External links

 JR Shikoku timetable

Railway stations in Tokushima Prefecture
Stations of Shikoku Railway Company
Railway stations in Japan opened in 1923
Naruto, Tokushima